Robin Robin is a 2021 stop-motion musical streaming television special produced by Aardman Animations, created and directed by Dan Ojari and Mikey Please, and written by Ojari, Please, and Sam Morrison.

Premise 
When a robin bird grows up from being raised by a family of mice, her differences become more apparent every time they try to sneak into a Who-Man's house. Now, she sets off on a daring heist to steal a shiny star and to prove to her family, and a malicious cat, that she can be a really good mouse.

Cast 
 Bronte Carmichael as Robin
 Richard E. Grant as Magpie
 Gillian Anderson as Cat
 Adeel Akhtar as Dad Mouse
 Amira Macey-Michael as Dink
 Tom Pegler as Pip
 Endeavour Clutterbuck as Flynn
 Megan Harris as Flin

Production

Development 
In November 2019, Aardman Animations and Netflix announced they would co-produce the half-hour stop-motion animated musical special Robin Robin, directed by Dan Ojari and Mikey Please from a script written by Ojari, Please, and Sam Morrison and Sarah Cox producing the special.

Casting 
In December 2020, Bronte Carmichael, Richard E Grant, Gillian Anderson, and Adeel Akhtar were cast in the special.

Filming 
In November 2019, it was announced that filming would start in 2020 and is the first Aardman project to use needle felting instead of plasticine.

Music 
In December 2020, The Bookshop Band was revealed as the composers with directors Dan Ojari and Mikey Please doing the lyrics for the songs. The orchestra was composed by the Bristol Ensemble.

Release
On 22 November 2019, the special was expected to be released in 2020. The special premiered on 27 November 2021 in Asia, and on the 24th in North America. On 17 June 2021, the official trailer was released confirming the release date. The short was part of the world touring screening The Animation Showcase 2021.

Reception
It was nominated for Best Animated Short Film at the 94th Academy Awards. It was also nominated for Animation at the British Academy Children's Awards 2022.

Merchandise
In March 2021, Aardman Animation made a licensing deal with both MacMillan Children’s Books and Aurora World for tie-in books and plush toys, respectively.

References

External links
 
 
 

Aardman Animations films
American adventure comedy films
American musical films
American children's animated films
American children's films
Animated films about animals
British children's animated films
British children's films
Stop-motion animated television shows
English-language Netflix original films
2020s English-language films
2020s American films
2020s British films